Duarte Nuno Pereira Gomes (born 16 January 1973) is a Portuguese retired football referee and media personality.

He started his career as a referee in 1991 at the district levels, ascending gradually to the first national category in 1997. He became an international referee in 2002. Besides domestic competitions, he also officiated at UEFA and FIFA matches.

He retired in 2016 and dedicated to media interests. Currently he participates in the football programme O Dia Seguinte at SIC Notícias, where he comments about controversial refereeing decisions. He previously authored the programme Ó Sr. Árbitro, also at SIC Notícias, which shed a light on refereeing in district football competitions He is also the author of the book and website Kickoff, launched in August 2017, which aims to explain the game rules and the role of the referees to the general public.

References

1973 births
Sportspeople from Lisbon
Living people
Portuguese football referees